Fram may refer to:

Ships 
 Fram (ship), an arctic exploration vessel from Norway
 MS Fram, expedition cruise ship owned by Hurtigruten Group

Places and geography
 Fram, Paraguay, a town in Itapúa, Paraguay
 Fram Formation, a sequence of rock strata on Ellesmere Island, Canada
 Fram, Rače–Fram, a settlement in Slovenia
 Fram (river), a stream in Slovenia
 Framlingham, town in England referred to by locals as "Fram"
Framingham, Massachusetts, a city often nicknamed "Fram"
Framingham State University, a university in that city also often nicknamed "Fram"
 Fram Strait, in the Arctic Ocean
 Fram Islands, in Antarctica
 Fram Mesa, in Antarctica
 Fram (crater), crater on Mars explored by the Opportunity rover
 6230 Fram, a minor planet and asteroid named after the ship

Arts and culture
 Fram (play), by Tony Harrison
 Fram (Middle-earth), fictional character from the stories of J. R. R. Tolkien
 Fram, the Polar Bear, children's book by Romanian writer Cezar Petrescu
 Fram Museum, a museum in Oslo, Norway

Sports
 Knattspyrnufélagið Fram, Icelandic association football club
 IF Fram Tórshavn, Faroese association football club
 IF Fram, Finnish association football club from Åland
 IF Fram Larvik, Norwegian sports club
 IL Fram, Norwegian sports club
 IL Hjelset-Fram, Norwegian sports club
 SK Fram (Oslo), Norwegian skiing and social club
 SK Fram, Norwegian sports club now a part of Selsbakk IF
 SK Fram, Norwegian sports club now a part of Brumunddal IL
 Framlingham Town F.C. (known as Fram), English association football club
 Fram Stadion, a football stadium in Larvik, Norway

People
 Fram (name), list of people with the name

As an acronym 
 Fleet Rehabilitation and Modernization, United States Navy and Coast Guard program to modernize older ships in their respective fleets 
 Fellow of the Royal Academy of Music in the University of London
 Ferroelectric RAM, electronic device using the ferroelectric effect to produce low density random access memory
 Flight Releasable Attachment Mechanism for ORUs on External stowage platforms of the International Space Station
 Functional Resonance Analysis Method, Modelling Complex Socio-technical Systems, by Erik Hollnagel

Other uses
 FRAM (brand), an American brand of automotive filters
 Fram (bicycle company), a Swedish bicycle manufacturer